Mount Zadruga is the ice-covered peak rising to 1700 m in the west part of Voden Heights on Oscar II Coast in Graham Land.  It surmounts upper Flask Glacier to the north, and a tributary to Fleece Glacier to the south-southeast.  The feature is named after the settlement of Zadruga in Northeastern Bulgaria.

Location

Maps
 British Antarctic Territory.  Scale 1:200000 topographic map.  DOS 610 Series, Sheet W 65 62.  Directorate of Overseas Surveys, Tolworth, UK, 1976.
 Antarctic Digital Database (ADD). Scale 1:250000 topographic map of Antarctica. Scientific Committee on Antarctic Research (SCAR). Since 1993, regularly upgraded and updated.

Notes

References
 Mount Zadruga. SCAR Composite Antarctic Gazetteer.
 Bulgarian Antarctic Gazetteer. Antarctic Place-names Commission. (details in Bulgarian, basic data in English)

External links
 Mount Zadruga. Copernix satellite image

Zadruga
Oscar II Coast
Bulgaria and the Antarctic